Meighen Island is an uninhabited member of the Queen Elizabeth Islands, part of the Arctic Archipelago, in the Qikiqtaaluk Region of Nunavut, Canada.

Features and history

The island is permanently icebound, and its northwestern coast faces onto the open Arctic Ocean.

Unlike many Canadian Arctic islands, no traces of Inuit or Thule camps have been found, suggesting the island has never been inhabited, likely due to its extreme northern latitude.

In 1909, two Inuit who had participated in Frederick Cook's polar expedition provided a map to Robert Peary that showed they had travelled and spent a night on a then unknown island with the position of Meighen Island. The map and testimony of the Inuit in question were published in an article by Peary in the Chicago Daily Tribune. In 1916, Vilhjalmur Stefansson's Canadian Arctic Expedition sighted and landed on Meighen Island. Stefansson at first believed that he had been the first European to discover Meighen Island, but later read Peary's article on the Cook expedition and surmised that Cook had in fact discovered Meighen Island prior to himself,

Naming

The island was later named after Arthur Meighen, Canadian prime minister 1920-21 and 1926.

Neighbouring islands

Meighen Island has few neighbours. About  to Meighen's north, across the Hose Strait, lies small crescent-shaped Perley Island. The Fay Islands lie between Meighen Island and Axel Heiberg Island within the Sverdrup Channel.

References

Bibliography

External links
 Meighen Island in the Atlas of Canada - Toporama; Natural Resources Canada

Islands of the Queen Elizabeth Islands
Uninhabited islands of Qikiqtaaluk Region
Sverdrup Islands
Meighen family